Abbasabad (also Romanized as ‘Abbāsābād) is a village in Mehrabad Rural District, Rudehen District, Damavand County, Tehran Province, Iran. At the 2006 census, its population was 68, in 15 families.

References 

Populated places in Damavand County